Marlene Winters-Wheeler is an Inuit politician in Labrador. She has been the speaker of the Nunatsiavut Assembly since her appointment on Feb. 2, 2021. She represents the constituency of Upper Lake Melville.

References 

Living people
21st-century Canadian politicians
21st-century Canadian women politicians
Inuit politicians
Indigenous leaders in Atlantic Canada
Inuit from Newfoundland and Labrador
Canadian Inuit women
Women legislative speakers
Year of birth missing (living people)